The Rose Technique, also known as Deranged, is a 2002 direct-to-DVD American film starring Sally Kirkland, JoBeth Williams, Kari Wuhrer, Jason Brooks and Sage Kirkpatrick.

Plot

The Rose Technique revolves around the life of an off-beat psychiatrist who wants to join the crazy world of daytime TV. She signs a contract with a school and becomes a teacher, but a student tries to prove that she is no angel. Strange things happen while the psychiatrist Doctor Lillian Rose is around.

Cast 

 JoBeth Williams as Dr. Lillian Rose
 Sally Kirkland as Helen
 Kari Wuhrer as Kristi
 Jason Brooks as Eddie
 Sage Kirkpatrick as Emily
 Denice Duff as Sally Winward
 Leo Rossi as Artie
 Robert Costanzo as Vince Trane
 Anicka Haywood as Brandy
 Peter Jason as Detective Atwood
 Nicolas Read as Jake
 Gibby Brand as Dr. Pierce
 Kevin Brief as Radio Station Manager

Reception 
Kevin Thomas of the Los Angeles Times said that writer Ray Stroeber had a promising idea, but that director Jon Scheide played the dark comedy too straight, and that the film fails to match the audacious performance from Williams.

References

External links 

 
 

2002 direct-to-video films
2002 films
2000s crime films
2000s English-language films
American crime films
2000s American films